Bali United Television, also known as Bali Utd TV, is an online streaming based TV channel, entirely dedicated to the Indonesian professional football club Bali United The channel offers Bali United fans home matches in Indonesian league and friendlies, as well as other themed programming.

This sport channel is operating in a sector of the Kapten I Wayan Dipta Stadium, since 24 September 2016. Before grand launching, Bali Utd TV already broadcasting live Trofeo Bali Celebest 2016 and Bali Soeratin Cup final 2016 between Bali United U-17 vs Putra Tresna at Kapten I Wayan Dipta Stadium, Gianyar.

Programs
Bali United 24/7
What's news
Grebek Semeton
Goal Skill Save
Bali United Challenge
Behind the Pitch
Tanya-tanya yuk!
How to Kick
Lady Dewata Corner

Personnel
 Producer: Hendra Bayu Dwiputra
 Cameramen & Editor:
 Yudistira Achmad Nugroho
 Genta Pradana
 Galih Seta Dananjati

References

External links
 Bali United (official website) 
 Bali United (official YouTube channel)

TV
Television channels and stations established in 2006